Lightning Bug are an American indie rock band from New York. The band consists of Audrey Kang, Logan Miley, and Kevin Copeland.

History
Lightning Bug formed in 2015 as the musical project of musician Audrey Kang. That year, they released their first full-length album titled Floaters. In 2017, Lightning Bug released a four song EP titled The Torment of Love. In 2019, the trio released their second full-length album titled October Song. After releasing that album, they caught the attention of Mississippi-based record label Fat Possum Records, who put the record out on vinyl. In 2021, the band announced their third full-length album, A Color Of The Sky, which was released on June 25.

Discography
Studio albums
Floaters (2015, self-released)
October Song (2019, self-released)
A Color of the Sky (2021, Fat Possum Records)

EPs
The Torment of Love (2017, self-released)

References

Fat Possum Records artists
Indie rock musical groups from New York (state)
Musical groups established in 2015
2015 establishments in New York (state)